Carlos Doncel Ordóñez (born 4 December 1996) is a Spanish professional footballer who plays as a left winger for Deportivo de La Coruña.

Club career
Born in Cabrera de Mar, Barcelona, Catalonia, Doncel finished his formation with CF Damm. On 2 July 2015, he joined Segunda División B side Lleida Esportiu, being initially assigned to the reserves in Primera Catalana.

On 21 August 2017, Doncel signed for RCD Espanyol B in Tercera División. On 2 July 2019, he moved to another reserve team, Real Valladolid Promesas in the third division after agreeing to a three-year contract.

On 22 August 2020, Doncel was loaned to SD Ponferradina of Segunda División for the 2020–21 season. He made his professional debut on 12 September, starting and scoring his team's only in a 1–2 home loss against CD Castellón for the second division championship.

On 7 August 2021, Doncel cut ties with Valladolid, and signed a two-year contract with Primera División RFEF side Deportivo de La Coruña six days later.

References

External links

1996 births
Living people
People from Maresme
Sportspeople from the Province of Barcelona
Spanish footballers
Footballers from Catalonia
Association football wingers
Segunda División players
Segunda División B players
Tercera División players
Primera Catalana players
CF Damm players
Lleida Esportiu footballers
RCD Espanyol B footballers
Real Valladolid Promesas players
SD Ponferradina players
Deportivo de La Coruña players